Varanosaurus ('monitor lizard') is an extinct genus of early pelycosaur synapsid that lived during the Kungurian.

Description
 
As its name implies, Varanosaurus may have looked superficially similar to present-day monitor lizards, though not related at all.

Varanosaurus had a flattened, elongated skull and a pointed snout with a row of sharp teeth, including two pairs of conspicuous pseudocanines, implying that it was an active predator.

Varanosaurus probably lived in swamps, competing with the larger Ophiacodon for food.

Classification
Below is a cladogram modified from the analysis of Benson (2012):

See also
 List of pelycosaurs

References

Further reading
Benes, Josef. Prehistoric Animals and Plants. Pg. 90. Artia: Prague, 1979.

Cisuralian synapsids of North America
Ophiacodontids
Fossil taxa described in 1904
Kungurian genus first appearances
Kungurian genus extinctions
Prehistoric synapsid genera